It Goes Like This is the debut studio album by American country music singer Thomas Rhett. It was released on October 29, 2013, via Valory Music Group. The album's release was announced on August 22.

Content
It includes the singles "It Goes Like This", "Get Me Some of That", and "Make Me Wanna". It also includes the previously released singles "Something to Do with My Hands" and "Beer with Jesus" from Rhett's prior self-titled EP release.

Jay Joyce produced six of the album's tracks, of which five previously appeared on Rhett's self-titled extended play. Michael Knox and Luke Laird produce three tracks each.

Critical reception

The album received positive reviews from critics. Steve Leggett of Allmusic rated the album 3.5 stars out of 5, saying that "It's a solidly professional outing, featuring all three of his singles and other tracks of similar construction, and it's full of energy, good humor, and the kind of backroad good-old-boy wisdom that everybody seems to love these days, even if it feeds more off nostalgia than reality." Giving it 4 out of 5 stars, Matt Bjorke of Roughstock called it "a very good, musically diverse debut album, an album which should find some sort of an audience."

Track listing

Personnel

 Thomas Rhett – lead vocals, acoustic guitar, mandolin, drums
 Tony Harrell – acoustic piano, Hammond B3 organ
 Matt Stanfield – keyboards
 Jody Stevens – programming
 Jay Joyce – Fender Rhodes, Hammond B3 organ, synth strings, programming, baritone guitar, electric guitar, mandolin, bass guitar, backing vocals
 Pat Buchanan – electric guitar
 J. T. Corenflos – electric guitar
 Jedd Hughes – electric guitar
 Rob McNelley – electric guitar, dobro
 Adam Shoenfeld – electric guitar
 Joel Key – acoustic guitar, banjo
 Luke Laird – acoustic guitar
 John Osborne – acoustic guitar, banjo 
 Danny Rader – acoustic guitar
 Ilya Toshinsky – acoustic guitar
 Ed Williams – acoustic guitar, mandolin, backing vocals
 Steve Fishell – pedal steel guitar
 Mike Johnson – steel guitar
 Russ Pahl – pedal steel guitar
 Kevin "Swine" Grantt – bass guitar, Jew's harp
 Lee Hendricks – bass guitar
 Jimmie Lee Sloas – bass guitar
 Matt Chamberlain – drums, percussion
 Fred Eltringham – drums, percussion 
 Greg Morrow – drums, drum programming 
 Craig Wright – drums, percussion
 Rich Redmond – percussion
 Brett Warren – harmonica, backing vocals
 Rhett Akins – backing vocals
 Danielle Bradbery – backing vocals
 Whitney Cheshier – backing vocals
 Mickey Jack Cones – backing vocals
 Virginia Davis – backing vocals
 Drew Gaw – backing vocals
 Kelsea Granda – backing vocals
 Jace Hall – backing vocals
 Tom Luteran – backing vocals
 Gloria Martinez – backing vocals
 Mark Martinez – backing vocals
 Alex Quattlebaum – backing vocals
 Nichole Rodriguez – backing vocals
 Jess Rosen – backing vocals
 Julie Stuckey – backing vocals
 Russell Terrell – backing vocals
 Samantha Thornton – backing vocals
 Kelly Tillotson – backing vocals
 Brad Warren – backing vocals

Chart performance
The album debuted at No. 6 on the Billboard 200 and No. 2 on the Top Current Albums chart with 36,000 copies sold in the U.S. on its first week of release.  The album has sold 271,000 copies in the US as of September 2015.

Weekly charts

Year-end charts

Certifications

References

2013 debut albums
Thomas Rhett albums
Big Machine Records albums
Albums produced by Jay Joyce
Albums produced by Michael Knox (record producer)